Shahin Shahr and Meymeh County is in Isfahan province in Iran. The capital of the county is the city of Shahin Shahr. It was created from the division of Borkhar and Meymeh County into Borkhar County and Shahin Shahr and Meymeh County. At the 2006 census, the population of the Central District and Meymeh District within the predecessor county was 182,394 in 49,364 households. The following census in 2011 counted 196,584 people in 58,162 households, by which time the two districts had been separated from the county to form Shahin Shahr and Meymeh County. At the 2016 census, the county's population was 234,667 in 73,981 households.

Administrative divisions

The population history and structural changes of Shahin Shahr and Meymeh County's administrative divisions over three consecutive censuses are shown in the following table. The latest census shows two districts, four rural districts, and six cities.

References

 

Counties of Isfahan Province